Cheonan Hyundai Capital Skywalkers is a South Korean professional volleyball team. The team was founded in 1983 and became fully professional in 2005. They are based in Cheonan and are members of the Korea Volleyball Federation (KOVO). Their home arena is Yu Gwan-Sun Gymnasium in Cheonan. They have won the championship four times, in 2006, 2007, 2017, and 2019.

History
In 1983, the team were established as Hyundai Motor Service Men's Volleyball Team. They had won the Korea Volleyball Super League five times between 1986 and 1995.

In 2002, they were refounded as Hyundai Capital Men's Volleyball team. After the foundation of the professional league in 2005, they won their first championship in the 2005–06 season.

Honours
 Korea Volleyball Super League
 Champions (5): 1986, 1987, 1987, 1994, 1995
Runners-up (10): 1988, 1990, 1993, 1996, 1997, 1998, 2000, 2001, 2003, 2004

V-League
Champions (4): 2005–06, 2006–07, 2016–17, 2018–19
Runners-up (7): 2005, 2007–08, 2008–09, 2009–10, 2013–14, 2015–16, 2017–18

KOVO Cup
Winners (4): 2006, 2008, 2010, 2013
Runners-up: 2009

Season-by-season records

Players

2022−23 team

Notes

References

External links

 Official website 

Volleyball clubs established in 1983
Cheonan
Cheonan
Hyundai Motor Group
South Korean volleyball clubs
1983 establishments in South Korea